The John Neely House is a property in Thompsons Station, Tennessee dating from c. 1810 that was listed on the National Register of Historic Places in 1988.  The property has also been known as Hilltop Manor.

The NRHP eligibility of the property was addressed in a 1988 study of Williamson County historical resources.

References

Houses on the National Register of Historic Places in Tennessee
Houses in Williamson County, Tennessee
Hall-parlor plan architecture in Tennessee
Houses completed in 1810
National Register of Historic Places in Williamson County, Tennessee